Relfo Ltd (in liq) v Varsani [2014] EWCA Civ 360 is an English unjust enrichment law case, concerning to what extent enrichment of the defendant must be at the expense of the claimant.

Facts
The liquidator of Relfo Ltd sued Varsani, a friend of the former director, who got money from the company. HMRC had sued Relfo Ltd for outstanding tax, whereupon Relfo Ltd put the £500,000 it had in its bank account to pay $890,050 into a Latvian account of Mirren Ltd, and then coincidentally an entity called Intertrade paid $878,469 from a Lithuanian bank account to Varsani. Shortly after Mr Varsani gave Mr Gorecia $100,000 The liquidator argued this was all connected, and the $100,000 was Mr Gorecia’s reward for diverting Relfo’s funds for Varsani’s benefit. Therefore, Relfo Ltd retained a title in equity over the funds that Mr Varsani held, that Varsani was on notice of the facts at all times and so was a constructive trustee, and that even if tracing was not possible the payments were connected enough to base an unjust enrichment claim.

Judgment

High Court
Sales J held the liquidator could recover the money. A proprietary argument against Varsani failed because the funds were dissipated and the liquidator had not applied for an order (which could have been done) to disclose where the funds went, which would be necessary for a tracing exercise. However, Varsani was a knowing recipient, it was a fair inference that all the transactions were linked, there was no reason for the Intertrade payment. His conscience would be affected as a constructive trustee because it was high probable that the director had explained Mr Varsani the whole arrangement, cf Re Montagu’s ST [1987] Ch 264. He was liable to account for the whole Intertrade payment without any reduction for the $100,000 transferred. And, even if the Intertrade payment could not be traced from the payment between Relfo Ltd and Mirren Ltd, Varsani was enriched at Relfo’s expense, as the payments were made in breach of Mr Gorecia’s fiduciary duty, without authority and established an in personam claim against Mr Varsani. Liability was strict and did not depend on knowledge or conscience. Mr Varsani had given no defence, and so he received the money as a volunteer.

Court of Appeal
The Court of Appeal held that the liquidator of Relfo Ltd was entitled to be repaid money that had ended up in Versani’s hands because the sums were causally linked through various transactions.

Arden LJ held that Sales J was right to draw the inference that Relfo Ltd’s money passed into Intertrade’s account, and this made the source of money paid to Varsani, as in El-Ajou, based on the amounts and the timing of  the payment to Mirren and the Intertrade payment, because the amount Varsani received was the same as the Relfo Ltd to Mirren payment, because no consideration was given, and because this is what Gorecia had intended. An intention alone would not be enough under the tracing rules, but could be relevant for drawing an inference. What mattered was that value was exchanged, in a chain of substitutes. Payments did not need to occur in chronological or any other particular order. Although not necessary, in a claim for unjust enrichment, it did not matter that Varsani had not received the Intertrade payment directly from Relfo Ltd. In substance and economic reality Varsani had been a direct recipient. Arden LJ said the following.

Gloster LJ concurred.

Floyd LJ concurred, and said the following.

See also

English unjust enrichment law

Notes

English unjust enrichment case law
High Court of Justice cases
2012 in British law
2012 in case law